Alex J. Raineri (September 17, 1918October 17, 1994) was an American lawyer, politician, and judge.  He was a member of the Wisconsin State Assembly and a Wisconsin Circuit Court Judge.

Biography
Raineri was born on September 17, 1918, in Hurley, Wisconsin. He attended the University of Notre Dame and DePaul University. During World War II, he served in the United States Army Corps of Engineers. He died in Utah on October 17, 1994.

Political career
Raineri was elected to the Assembly in 1944. He was a Republican. He chose not to run again for the Assembly in the 1948 elections.

References

People from Hurley, Wisconsin
Republican Party members of the Wisconsin State Assembly
Military personnel from Wisconsin
United States Army Corps of Engineers personnel
United States Army soldiers
United States Army personnel of World War II
University of Notre Dame alumni
DePaul University alumni
Wisconsin state court judges
1918 births
1994 deaths
20th-century American politicians
20th-century American judges